Michelman is a surname. Notable people with the surname include:

 Eric Michelman, American inventor of the mouse scroll-wheel
 Frank Michelman (born 1936), American law professor
 Kate Michelman (born 1942), American political activist
 Ken Michelman (born 1955), American actor